Dipple may refer to:

 Dipple, Ohio, United States
 Dipple, Moray, Scotland
 Allan Dipple (born 1956), Australian racing cyclist
 Jo Dipple (born 1968), British businesswoman
 Dipple, a book series by Andre Norton

See also 
 Dippel, a surname